Orohermes is a genus of fishflies in the family Corydalidae. There is one described species in Orohermes, O. crepusculus.

References

Further reading

External links

 

Corydalidae
Articles created by Qbugbot